Kris Smith (born 20 August 1978) is an English Australian model, television presenter and former professional rugby league footballer.

Career

Rugby league
In England, Smith played for a number of British Super League clubs including the Leeds Rhinos, London Broncos, Halifax Blue Sox, Salford Red Devils, Oldham Roughyeds (Heritage № 1201) and Swinton Lions.

Modelling
Smith has worked extensively as a model after he was signed to an agency in the United Kingdom following his retirement from rugby league.

Following his move to Australia in 2008, he was signed as a Myer ambassador - a contract that has subsequently been renewed several times.

Television
In 2010, Smith was announced as the new co-host of FOX8 reality series Football Superstar replacing Brian McFadden.

Smith was one of the celebrity contestants to compete on the first episode of Celebrity Come Dine With Me Australia on Lifestyle. Smith competed against Josh Thomas, Chloe Maxwell and Prue MacSween on the episode which aired in December 2012.

Throughout 2012 and 2013, Smith was a regular contributor to Network Ten's discussion program Can of Worms.

In June 2013 Smith was announced as one of the four original presenters of the Seven Network's new early afternoon infotainment program The Daily Edition, hosting the show alongside Tom Williams, Monique Wright and Sally Obermeder. Smith continued in this role until it was announced he would be scaling back his commitments to the program from January 2015.

It was revealed in January 2017 that Smith would be one of the contestants to compete on the third series of Network Ten reality series, I'm a Celebrity...Get Me Out of Here!. Smith was the fourth celebrity to be eliminated from the competition. His nominated charity was White Ribbon Australia, having revealed on the show he was once the victim of domestic violence.

Smith guest hosted Network Ten lifestyle program The Living Room in 2018. Also that year, he was one of the celebrities who took part in the Seven Network's The Real Full Monty. In early 2019, it was reported that Smith had teamed up with three of his The Real Full Monty castmates (Shane Jacobson, Todd McKenney and Brian Taylor) to film a new travel comedy show for the Seven Network called Mates on a Mission.

In August 2019, Smith appeared on a celebrity edition of The Chase Australia alongside Lisa Curry, Brendan Jones and Ricki-Lee Coulter.  The team managed to achieve a collective total of $47,000 during the first four rounds for their respective charities, but lost the money when they were beaten by The Chaser, Matt Parkinson in the "Final Chase". Smith was representing Challenge.

Personal life
Smith has had a number of highly publicised relationships, including with performer Dannii Minogue, with model and nutritionist Maddy King, and with personal trainer and former Australia's Next Top Model contestant, Sarah Boulazeris.

He has one son with Minogue who was born 2010, and two daughters with Boulazeris, born in 2018 and 2019.

Smith suffers from osteoarthritis and will need to get titanium knee replacements in the future.

Smith is also known for his involvement with a number of charitable organisations and causes.

References 

1978 births
Australian male models
Australian people of English descent
Australian rugby league players
Australian television presenters
English emigrants to Australia
English male models
English television presenters
English rugby league players
Halifax R.L.F.C. players
Living people
London Broncos players
Models from Sydney
Oldham R.L.F.C. players
Rugby league players from Salford
Rugby articles needing expert attention
Sportspeople from Salford
Swinton Lions players